André Gagnon  (2 August 1936 – 3 December 2020) was a Canadian pianist, composer, conductor, arranger, and actor, known for his fusion of classical and pop styles, including compositions Neiges, Smash, Chevauchée, Surprise, Donna, and Mouvements in the disco and pop fields. Gagnon also composed for television, including La Souris Verte, Vivre en ce Pays, Format 60, Format 30,Techno-Flash, and Les Forges de Saint-Maurice as well as for theatre with such productions as La Poudre aux Yeux, Doña Rosita, Terre d'Aube, La Dame de Chez Maxim's, and Wouf-Wouf. Some of his most notable songs are "Pour les Amants", "Turluteries", and "Mes Quatre Saisons".

Early life
Gagnon was born in Saint-Pacôme, Quebec, Canada. The youngest of nineteen children, Gagnon began composing at the age of six and according to the Canadian Encyclopedia, "He took theory lessons with Léon Destroismaisons in Ste. Anne-de-la-Pocatière from 1952-53 and studied at the Conservatoire de musique à Montréal with Germaine Malépart (piano), Clermont Pépin (composition), and Gilberte Martin (solfège) from 1957 to 1961."

Career

According to Gagnon's official website, "In 1974, André Gagnon released Saga, his first album, composed solely of original instrumental pieces". In 1975, the album Neiges stayed on the American Billboard's Top 10 for twenty-four weeks and sold 700,000 copies worldwide. In May 1976, Gagnon did four concerts in Mexico and in September of the same year, Neiges was released in New York under the title Driven Snow. In 1977, Neiges won a Juno award for the most purchased album in Canada while Gagnon's album Le Saint-Laurent rapidly reached 100,000 sold copies. In 1978, André Gagnon was made an officer of the Order of Canada. In the fall of 1979, Gagnon received his first Félix, an award created by the Quebecois music industry in the instrumental category for the album Le Saint-Laurent. He also began to add film scores to his repertoire, among them the soundtracks to Running (1979), the John Huston film Phobia (1980), and The Hot Touch (1981), directed by Roger Vadim. Gagnon went on world tour in 1981 to the United States, Venezuela, Mexico, Greece, and Romania. During this year, he also composed original music for the film Tell Me That You Love Me, a production of Astral Films. In October, he recorded Impressions in the famous Abbey Road studio.

In February 1990, the opera Nelligan was released, for which Gagnon wrote the music. The opera was presented first at the Grand Theatre of Quebec and then the Place of the Arts of Montreal and finally at the National Centre of the Arts of Ottawa. Following the opera's Canadian release was the release of the studio-recorded double album, Nelligan.
 
In January 1992, Gagnon composed the music for the film The Pianist. In 1999, the album Juliette Pomerleau was released. In 2011, the album Les chemins ombragés was certified a gold album having sold 40,000 copies.

Gagnon also composed music for many artists, such as Diane Dufresne (Le 304), Renée Claude (Je suis une femme d'aujourd'hui, Ballade pour mes vieux jours) and Nicole Martin (Mannequin).

Gagnon died on 3 December 2020, at age 84. He had suffered from Lewy body disease.

Awards and recognition

Juno awards 
 1978: Instrumental Artist of the Year
 1995: Instrumental Artist of the Year

He has received Juno nominations in several other years.

Government honours
Gagnon was appointed an Officer of the Order of Canada in 1978 and an Officer of the National Order of Quebec in 2018.

Discography

Albums

Singles

References

External links 

 
 The Canadian Encyclopedia: André Gagnon

1936 births
2020 deaths
French Quebecers
Officers of the Order of Canada
Canadian composers
Canadian male composers
London Records artists
Columbia Records artists
New-age pianists
Musicians from Quebec
Juno Award for Album of the Year winners
Juno Award for Instrumental Album of the Year winners
Juno Award for Classical Album of the Year – Vocal or Choral Performance winners
Canadian male pianists
21st-century Canadian pianists
21st-century Canadian male musicians
Félix Award winners
Deaths from dementia in Canada
Deaths from Lewy body dementia